Masatoshi Sanma (born August 18, 1977 in Naka, Tokushima) is a Japanese slalom canoeist who competed at the international level from 1997 to 2011. He was eliminated in the semifinals of the C2 event at the 2008 Summer Olympics in Beijing, finishing in 9th place.

His partner in the C2 boat was Hiroyuki Nagao.

World Cup individual podiums

1 Asia Canoe Slalom Championship counting for World Cup points

References

1977 births
Canoeists at the 2008 Summer Olympics
Japanese male canoeists
Living people
Olympic canoeists of Japan
Canoeists at the 2010 Asian Games
Asian Games competitors for Japan
Sportspeople from Tokushima Prefecture